Lencan is a small family of nearly extinct indigenous Mesoamerican languages.

Languages
There are two attested Lencan languages, both extinct (Campbell 1997:167).

Salvadoran Lencan was spoken in Chilanga and Potó (thus the alternative language name Potón). Lencans had arrived in El Salvador about 2,000 years B.P. and founded the site of Quelepa.  One speaker remains.
Honduran Lencan was spoken with minor dialect differences in Intibucá, Opatoro, Guajiquiro, Similatón (modern Cabañas), and Santa Elena.  Some phrases survive; it is not known if the entire language still exists.

The languages are not closely related; Swadesh (1967) estimated 3,000 years since separation. Arguedas Cortés (1987) reconstructs Proto-Lencan with 12 consonants (including ejectives) and 5 vowels.

External relationships
The external relationships of the Lencan languages are disputed. Inclusion within Macro-Chibchan has often been proposed; Campbell (1987) reported that he found no solid evidence for such a connection, but Constenla-Umaña (2005) proposed regular correspondence between Lencan, Misumalpan, and Chibchan.

Campbell (2012) acknowledges that these claims of connection between Lencan, Misumalpan, and Chibchan have not yet been proved systematically, but he notes that Constenla-Umaña (2005) "presented evidence to support a relationship with two neighboring families [of languages]: Misumalpan and Lencan, which constitute the Lenmichí Micro-Phylum. According to [Constenla-Umaña's study (2005)], the Lenmichi Micro-Phylum first split into Proto-Chibchan and Proto-Misulencan, the common intermediate ancestor of the Lencan and the Misumalpan languages. This would have happened around 9,726 years before the present or 7,720 B.C. (the average of the time depths between the Chibchan languages and the Misulencan languages)...The respective subancestors of the Lencan and the Misumalpan languages would have separated around 7,705 before the present (5,069 B.C.), and Paya and the other intermediate ancestors of all the other Chibchan languages would have separated around 6,682 (4,676 B.C.)."

Another proposal by Lehmann (1920:727) links Lencan with the Xincan language family, though Campbell (1997:167) rejects most of Lehmann's twelve lexical comparisons as invalid. An automated computational analysis (ASJP 4) by Müller et al. (2013) also found lexical similarities between Lencan and Xincan. However, since the analysis was automatically generated, the grouping could be either due to mutual lexical borrowing or genetic inheritance.

History
The Proto-Lencan homeland was most likely in central Honduras (Campbell 1997:167).

At the time of the Spanish conquest of Central America in the early 16th century, the Lenca language was spoken by the Lenca people in a region that incorporated northwestern and southwestern Honduras, and neighboring eastern El Salvador, east of the Lempa river.  While the Lenca people continue to live in the same region today, Lyle Campbell reported in the 1970s that he found only one speaker of the language in Chilanga, El Salvador, and none in Honduras. Campbell also concluded that Salvadoran Lenca was a distinct language from Honduran Lenca.

Indigenous movements in both countries are attempting to revive the language, and recent press reports from Honduras indicate that elementary school textbooks in Salvadoran Lenca have been distributed to public schools in the region.

A 2002 novel by Roberto Castillo, La guerra mortal de los sentidos, chronicles the adventures of the "Searcher for the Lenca Language."

Proto-language
Proto-Lenca reconstructions by Arguedas (1988):

{| class="wikitable sortable"
! No. !! Spanish gloss (original) !! English gloss (translated) !! Proto-Lenca
|-
| 1. || abrir || open (verb) || *inkolo-
|-
| 2. || agua || water || *was
|-
| 3. || anciana || old woman || 
|-
| 4. || araña || spider || *katu
|-
| 5. || ardilla || squirrel || *suri
|-
| 6. || bailar || dance || *uli-
|-
| 7. || bañar || bathe || *twa-
|-
| 8. || beber || drink || *tali-
|-
| 9. || blanco || white || *soko
|-
| 10. || boca || mouth || *in
|-
| 11. || bueno || good || *sam
|-
| 12. || cabello || hair || *asak
|-
| 13. || caites || sandals || *waktik
|-
| 14. || camarón || shrimp || *siksik
|-
| 15. || camino || path || *k’in
|-
| 16. || casa || house || *t’aw
|-
| 17. || cerrar || close (verb) || *inkap-
|-
| 18. || cinco || five || *ts’aj
|-
| 19. || comal || comal || *k’elkin
|-
| 20. || comprar || buy || *liwa-
|-
| 21. || cortar || cut || *tajk-
|-
| 22. || coyol || coyol || *juku
|-
| 23. || coyote || coyote || *sua
|-
| 24. || chupar || suck || 
|-
| 25. || decir || say || *aj-
|-
| 26. || desear || want || *saj
|-
| 27. || diente || tooth || *nek
|-
| 28. || dos || two || *pe
|-
| 29. || él || he || *inani
|-
| 30. || enfermo, estar || sick || *ona-
|-
| 31. || espina || thorn || *ma
|-
| 32. || este || this || *na
|-
| 33. || estrella || star || *sirik
|-
| 34. || flor || flower || *sula
|-
| 35. || fuego || fire || *juk’a
|-
| 36. || grande || big || *pukV
|-
| 37. || guacal || tub || *k’akma
|-
| 38. || hermano || brother || *pelek
|-
| 39. || hígado || liver || *muts’u
|-
| 40. || hormiga || ant || *its’its’i
|-
| 41. || hueso || bone || *ts’ek
|-
| 42. || ir || go || *o-
|-
| 43. || jocote || jocote || *muraka
|-
| 44. || lavar || wash || *ts’ajk-
|-
| 45. || leña || firewood || *sak
|-
| 46. || lluvia || rain || *so
|-
| 47. || macho || male || *kew
|-
| 48. || maíz || corn || *ajma
|-
| 49. || mapachín || raccoon || *wala
|-
| 50. || milpa || cornfield || *ta
|-
| 51. || montaña || mountain || *kotan
|-
| 52. || mover || move || *lum-
|-
| 53. || nariz || nose || *nep
|-
| 54. || niño || boy || *we
|-
| 55. || nosotros || we || *apinani
|-
| 56. || nube || cloud || 
|-
| 57. || oír || hear || *eni-
|-
| 58. || orinar || urinate || *wajsa-
|-
| 59. || pavo || turkey || *lok
|-
| 60. || peine || comb || *tenmaskin
|-
| 61. || pelo, pluma || hair, feather || 
|-
| 62. || perro || dog || *su
|-
| 63. || pico || peak || *ints’ek
|-
| 64. || piedra || stone || *ke
|-
| 65. || piña || pineapple || *mats’ati
|-
| 66. || piojo || louse || *tem
|-
| 67. || puerco de monte || wild pig || *map’it, *nap’it
|-
| 68. || pulga || flea || *t’ut’u
|-
| 69. || quebracho || quebracho tree || *sili
|-
| 70. || quién || who || *k’ulan
|-
| 71. || reír || laugh || *jolo-
|-
| 72. || río || river || *wara
|-
| 73. || roble || oak || *mal
|-
| 74. || ropa || clothes || *lam-
|-
| 75. || rostro || face || *tik
|-
| 76. || saber || know || *ti-
|-
| 77. || seis || six || *wi
|-
| 78. || sembrar || sow || *isa-
|-
| 79. || tapesco, cama || bed frame, bed || *le-
|-
| 80. || tigre (jaguar), león (puma) || tiger (jaguar), lion (puma) || *lepa
|-
| 81. || tocar || touch || *jete-
|-
| 82. || trabajar || work || 
|-
| 83. || tres || three || *lawa
|-
| 84. || tú || you (sg.) || *amanani
|-
| 85. || uña || fingernail || *kumam
|-
| 86. || venir || come || *po-
|-
| 87. || yo || I || *unani
|-
| 88. || zarigüeya || opossum || *ts’ewe
|-
| 89. || zopilote || vulture || *kus
|}

References

Bibliography
 Campbell, Lyle. 1997. American Indian Languages: The Historical Linguistics of Native America. Oxford: Oxford University Press.
Campbell, Lyle. 2012. The Indigenous Languages of South America: A Comprehensive Guide. De Gruyter Mouton: Walter de Gruyter GmbH & Co. KG, Berlin/Boston.
 Constenla Umaña, Adolfo. (1981). Comparative Chibchan Phonology. (Ph.D. dissertation, Department of Linguistics, University of Pennsylvania, Philadelphia).
 Constenla Umaña, Adolfo. (1991). Las lenguas del Área Intermedia: Introducción a su estudio areal. Editorial de la Universidad de Costa Rica, San José.
 Constenla Umaña, Adolfo. (1995). Sobre el estudio diacrónico de las lenguas chibchenses y su contribución al conocimiento del pasado de sus hablantes. Boletín del Museo del Oro 38-39: 13-56.
 Constenla Umaña, Adolfo (2005). "Existe relacion genealogica entre las lenguas misumalpas y las chibchenses?" Estudios de Linguistica Chibcha. 23: 9–59.
 Fabre, Alain. 2005. Diccionario etnolingüístico y guía bibliográfica de los pueblos indígenas sudamericanos: LENCA. 
 Hemp, Eric. 1976.  "On Earlier Lenca Vowels". International Journal of American Linguistics 42(1): 78-79.
 Lehman, Walter. 1920. Zentral-Amerika. see pp. 700–719 (Salvadoran Lenca) and pp. 668–692 (Honduran Lenca).

External links

OLAC resources in and about the Lenca language
Audio Recording of an Elicitation and Wordlist in Lenca from the MesoAmerican Languages Collection of Lyle Campbell at the Archive of the Indigenous Languages of Latin America.

 
Languages
Macro-Chibchan languages
Language families
Indigenous languages of Central America
Mesoamerican languages
Languages of El Salvador
Languages of Honduras
Extinct languages of North America